Carl Gustav Verbraeken (born 18 September 1950 in Wilrijk, Belgium) is a Belgian composer.

Verbraeken studied at the Royal Conservatory of Brussels.  He wrote more than 1000 works, including piano music, chamber music and orchestral works. Since 2011, he is president of the Union of Belgian Composers.

References
 Flavie Roquet: Lexicon: Vlaamse componisten geboren na 1800, Roeselare, Roularta Books, 2007, 946 p.,

External links

Works of Carl Verbraeken in the MATRIX catalog

1950 births
Living people
20th-century classical composers
21st-century classical composers
Belgian classical composers
Belgian male classical composers
Belgian pianists
Musicians from Antwerp
People from Wilrijk
Royal Conservatory of Brussels alumni
Academic staff of the Royal Conservatory of Brussels
KU Leuven alumni
Male pianists
21st-century pianists
20th-century Belgian male musicians
21st-century male musicians